Dinteloord en Prinsenland is a former municipality in the Dutch province of North Brabant, now part of the municipality of Steenbergen. The main town of the municipality was Dinteloord.

Dinteloord en Prinsenland was a separate municipality until 1997.

References

Municipalities of the Netherlands disestablished in 1997
Former municipalities of North Brabant
Steenbergen